The 1958 All-Eastern football team consists of American football players chosen by various selectors as the best players at each position among the Eastern colleges and universities during the 1958 NCAA University Division football season.

Backs 
 Chuck Zimmerman, Syracuse (AP-1 [qb])
 Bob Anderson, Army (AP-1)
 Bill Austin, Rutgers (AP-1)
 Pete Dawkins, Army (AP-1)

Ends 
 Gene O'Pella, Villanova (AP-1)
 Jim Kenney, Boston University (AP-1)

Tackles 
 Bob Novogratz, Army (AP-1)
 Ron Luciano, Syracuse (AP-1)

Guards 
 John Guzik, Pitt (AP-1)
 Jim Healy, Holy Cross (AP-1)

Center 
 Steve Garba, Penn State (AP-1)

Key
 AP = Associated Press
 UPI = United Press International

See also
 1958 College Football All-America Team

References

All-Eastern
All-Eastern college football teams